Radoslav Rogina (born March 3, 1979) is a Croatian former professional road bicycle racer, who rode professionally between 2002 and 2020, for the Tenax, Loborika and  teams. Rogina represented Croatia at the 2008 Summer Olympics when he finished 25th in the road race event. He represented Croatia again at the 2012 Summer Olympics in London finishing 41st in road race.

Major results

1999
 2nd Road race, National Road Championships
2000
 3rd Time trial, National Road Championships
 4th Poreč Trophy
2001
 2nd Road race, National Road Championships
 3rd Overall GP Kranj
1st Stage 2
 8th Poreč Trophy
2002
 National Road Championships
2nd Time trial
3rd Road race
 6th Overall Tour de Normandie
 6th Poreč Trophy
 9th Gran Premio della Costa Etruschi
2003
 National Road Championships
1st  Road race
1st  Time trial
 1st Overall The Paths of King Nikola
1st Stages 1 & 3
 1st GP Istria 3
 2nd Overall Tour de l'Avenir
 2nd Poreč Trophy
 3rd Overall Istrian Spring Trophy
 10th Overall Tour of Slovenia
 10th Overall Tour of Austria
 10th GP Istria 2
2004
 National Road Championships
2nd Road race
2nd Time trial
 6th Giro del Medio Brenta
2005
 2nd Road race, National Road Championships
 3rd Overall Tour of Slovenia
2006
 1st Overall The Paths of King Nikola
1st Points classification
1st Mountains classification
1st Stage 3
 3rd GP Hydraulika Mikolasek
 3rd Grand Prix Kooperativa
 6th Overall Tour of Slovenia
 7th Giro d'Oro
 7th Rund um die Hainleite
 9th Overall Vuelta a Cuba
2007
 1st Overall Tour of Croatia
 1st GP Triberg-Schwarzwald
 2nd Road race, National Road Championships
 2nd Overall Tour de Serbie
1st Stage 2
 2nd Memorijal Nevio Valčić
 2nd Beograd–Čačak
 3rd Overall Paris–Corrèze
 4th Overall Tour du Loir-et-Cher
 4th Overall Okolo Slovenska
 5th Overall Szlakiem Grodów Piastowskich
 7th Overall The Paths of King Nikola
 10th GP Kranj
2008
 2nd Overall Tour de Serbie
1st Stages 2 & 4
 3rd Overall Istrian Spring Trophy
 3rd Overall Rhône-Alpes Isère Tour
 3rd Memorijal Stjepan Grgac
 4th Overall The Paths of King Nikola
 4th Overall Tour of Slovenia
1st Stage 2
 8th GP Ljubljana–Zagreb
2009
 1st  Road race, National Road Championships
 1st Overall The Paths of King Nikola
1st Stage 1
 1st Trofeo Internazionale Bastianelli
 2nd Memorijal Stjepan Grgac
 3rd Overall Istrian Spring Trophy
 4th Overall Tour of Qinghai Lake
 4th Memorijal Nevio Valčić
 5th GP Folignano
2010
 1st  Road race, National Road Championships
 2nd Overall Tour of Qinghai Lake
1st Stage 1
 2nd Poreč Trophy
 3rd Overall Istrian Spring Trophy
1st Stage 3
 3rd Overall Tour du Maroc
1st Stage 2
 4th GP Folignano
 4th GP Betonexpressz 2000
 4th Memorijal Stjepan Grgac
 6th Overall Rhône-Alpes Isère Tour
 6th Trofeo Zsšdi
 8th GP Ljubljana–Zagreb
2011
 1st Memorijal Stjepan Grgac
 2nd Overall Istrian Spring Trophy
 2nd Overall Tour of Slovenia
 3rd Belgrade–Banja Luka I
 3rd GP Judendorf Straßenengel
 4th Trofeo Zsšdi
 4th Trofeo Internazionale Bastianelli
 5th Poreč Trophy
 5th Tour of Vojvodina I
 6th Overall Circuit des Ardennes
 9th Tour of Vojvodina II
 10th Central European Tour Budapest GP
 10th GP Ljubljana–Zagreb
2012
 5th Belgrade–Banja Luka I
 5th Belgrade–Banja Luka II
 8th Giro dell'Appennino
 10th Overall Szlakiem Grodów Piastowskich
1st  Mountains classification
1st Stage 4
2013
 1st  Overall Tour of Slovenia
1st  Mountains classification
1st Stage 3
 1st GP Sencur
 2nd Road race, National Road Championships
 2nd Overall Istrian Spring Trophy
 2nd Overall Settimana Ciclistica Lombarda
 2nd Raiffeisen Grand Prix
 4th Grand Prix Südkärnten
 5th Central European Tour Košice–Miskolc
 6th GP Kranj
 7th Croatia–Slovenia
 8th Giro dell'Appennino
2014
 1st  Road race, National Road Championships
 1st  Overall Sibiu Cycling Tour
1st  Points classification
1st Stage 1
 1st GP Judendorf-Strassengel
 4th Overall Tour d'Azerbaïdjan
 8th Overall Tour of Al Zubarah
 10th Overall Okolo Slovenska
2015
 1st  Overall Tour of Qinghai Lake
 6th Overall Tour of Slovenia
2016
 1st  Road race, National Road Championships
 2nd GP Kranj
 4th GP Izola
 5th Overall Tour of Croatia
 9th Croatia–Slovenia
 10th Overall Tour of Małopolska
2017
 5th Overall Tour of Qinghai Lake
 9th Overall Okolo Jižních Čech
 10th Overall Szlakiem Grodów Piastowskich
2018
 3rd Overall Tour of Qinghai Lake
 4th Overall Tour of Croatia
 5th Overall Rhône-Alpes Isère Tour
 7th Overall Istrian Spring Trophy
2019
 2nd Road race, National Road Championships
 3rd Overall Sibiu Cycling Tour
 4th Overall Tour of Bihor
 7th Overall Tour of Antalya
 10th Overall CRO Race

References

External links

Croatian male cyclists
Cyclists at the 2008 Summer Olympics
Cyclists at the 2012 Summer Olympics
Olympic cyclists of Croatia
1979 births
Living people
Sportspeople from Varaždin